The Pinacoteca Querini Stampalia is an art collection and museum in Venice, Italy. Situated inside the Palazzo Querini Stampalia, in the sestiere of Castello, on the left bank of the Grand Canal, it includes famous paintings as a self- portrait and Adam and Eve by Palma Giovane, a Sacra Conversazione by Palma Vecchio and a Madonna and Child by Bernardo Strozzi. It also holds prized drawings by Giovanni Bellini, Raphael, Paolo Veronese, Titian, and Tintoretto.

The picture gallery is displayed within twenty rooms on the second floor of the palace which also contains furniture, a large public library, porcelains and musical instruments, along with works by artists ranging from the 14th-18th century.

History
The palazzo was renovated from its original state before the 1960s. From 1961–1963, Carlo Scarpa restored parts of the building, while changing others. Scarpa created a series of islands, and allowed the water to come into the lobby space. He also restored the idea of a courtyard garden behind the building, with an abstracted rill fountain. Later additions (1993–2003) are by Mario Botta. The palace also houses the Fondazione Querini Stampalia, which sponsors a prominent library and contemporary art expositions.

Collections

Paintings

Sculptures

References

External links

Official website

Museums with year of establishment missing
Art museums and galleries in Venice
Modernist architecture in Italy